The Gilgit River is a tributary of the Indus River, and flows through the Gupis-Yasin, Ghizer and Gilgit districts of Gilgit-Baltistan.  The Gilgit River starts from Shandur Lake, and joins the Indus River at near towns of Juglot and Bunji, where also the three mountain ranges of Hindu Kush, Himalaya and Karakoram ranges are believed to meet. The upper sections of the Gilgit river are called Gupis River and Ghizer River.

See also
Shandur Pass

References

Tributaries of the Indus River
Rivers of Gilgit-Baltistan
Karakoram
Rivers of Pakistan